The Armorial Register is a publisher of heraldic and associated science topics, founded in 2006. It produces the "International Register of Arms", a private armorial where people from all over the world can register their granted, inherited or assumed arms. However it has no jurisdiction over heraldic or genealogical matters. Its coat of arms is displayed on the website. From time to time, its "Roll of Arms" is edited into book format, of which there have been three volumes so far.

Coat of Arms of The Armorial Register Limited 
The Armorial Register Limited petitioned for and received a grant of armorial bearings from the Court of the Lord Lyon: Granted by the Court of the Lord Lyon Scotland: 69th Page 90th Volume of the Public Register of All Arms and bearings of Scotland, 23 December 2013.

See also 
 College of Arms
 Lyon Court
 Canadian Heraldic Authority
 Chief Herald of Ireland
Council of Heraldry and Vexillology (Belgium)
 Committee on Heraldry of the New England Historic Genealogical Society
Burke's Peerage & Baronetage

Notes and references

External links 
 http://www.armorialregister.com

Armorials